Benign neonatal seizures include two disorders: benign idiopathic neonatal seizures and benign familial neonatal seizures. They are not classified as epilepsy. Anticonvulsants are not needed. And those affected do not develop epilepsy when they grow up.

References

Seizure types
Neonatology